Mount Remarkable National Park is a protected area in the Australian state of South Australia located about  north of the state capital of Adelaide and  east of Port Augusta.

On 26 November 2021 a non-contiguous portion of the park to the south of the park, known as the Napperby Block, was combined with several other conservation parks to create the new Wapma Thura–Southern Flinders Ranges National Park.

History
Land associated with the Park at Mambray Creek and Alligator Gorge first obtained protected area status in 1952 as 'national pleasure resorts' declared under the then National Pleasure Resorts Act 1914. They were managed by the South Australian Government Tourist Bureau from 1952 to 1967.

In 1964, the National Parks Commission submitted a proposal to the Government of South Australia for "comprehensive national parks" covering an area larger than that of the existing national pleasure resorts. This resulted in the creation of three separate reserves - the Alligator Gorge Wildlife Reserve, the Mambray Creek Wildlife Reserve and the Mount Remarkable Wildlife Reserve, that were respectively constituted in July 1965, September 1967 and March 1966.

In 1972, the three wildlife reserves were re-proclaimed under the National Parks and Wildlife Act 1972 as the Mount Remarkable National Park.

In 2000, further land was added to the park, which was subsequently named The Warren Bonython Link in honour of Warren Bonython’s "long personal interest in the area" and "his association with the National Parks Foundation". The park had a total area of  after this addition.

On 26  November 2021, the Napperby Block was combined with the former Telowie Gorge Conservation Park, Wirrabara Range Conservation Park, Spaniards Gully Conservation, to form the Wapma Thura–Southern Flinders Ranges National Park.

Description

The national park consists of two  separate areas. The first is the parcel of land (often called a "block) located immediately west of the town of Melrose and consists of three areas: the Warren Bonython Link, Mambray Creek and Mount Remarkable. This block occupies .

Its area was  including the Napperby Block (that is, until 26 November 2021).

The park is classified as an IUCN Category VI protected area.

Flora and fauna
It is filled with a wide variety of animals and birds such as goannas, emus, echidna and kookaburras, which can be seen walking around the park. Besides these, it is home to 117 native bird species, including Australian ringnecks and wedge-tailed eagles. 
Unique mixture of arid and temperate flora intermixing within the region makes the Mt. Remarkable a biodiversity hotspot. Temperate trees common in the Great Dividing Range such as White Box, Long Leaved Box, Grey Box and South Australian Blue Gum ( Eucalyptus Leucoxylon Pruinosa) have a presence here. The unique Sugar Gum is a forest forming Eucalypt that is a relict tree of wetter times in South Australia. The Flinders Ranges variety of Sugar Gum is Cladocalyx Petila. Capable of growing to 40 metres tall and along with Long Leaved Box forms the most northerly biome of open forest in South Australia.

Rusty Pods, a bush with beautiful purple flowers, is another unique plant that can only be found in the higher parts of the Great Dividing Range. It can be commonly found only along Mt Remarkable Range; with a few outliers in Wirrabara forest, Mount Brown and Mt Aleck.

The Southern Flinders Ranges also provide a geographical barrier between semi-arid plants between the Eastern and Western halves of Australia.

Gallery

See also
Protected areas of South Australia

Citations and references

Citations

References

External links

National parks of South Australia
Protected areas established in 1952
1952 establishments in Australia